The canton of Rozay-en-Brie is a French former administrative division, located in the arrondissement of Provins, in the Seine-et-Marne département (Île-de-France région). It was disbanded following the French canton reorganisation which came into effect in March 2015.

Demographics

Composition 
The canton of Rozay-en-Brie was composed of 22 communes:

Bernay-Vilbert
La Chapelle-Iger
Les Chapelles-Bourbon
Courpalay
Crèvecœur-en-Brie
Dammartin-sur-Tigeaux
Fontenay-Trésigny
Hautefeuille
La Houssaye-en-Brie
Lumigny-Nesles-Ormeaux
Marles-en-Brie
Mortcerf
Neufmoutiers-en-Brie
Pézarches
Le Plessis-Feu-Aussoux
Rozay-en-Brie
Tigeaux
Touquin
Vaudoy-en-Brie
Villeneuve-le-Comte
Villeneuve-Saint-Denis
Voinsles

See also
Cantons of the Seine-et-Marne department
Communes of the Seine-et-Marne department

References

Rozay en brie
2015 disestablishments in France
States and territories disestablished in 2015